CRISPR-Cas design tools are computer software platforms and bioinformatics tools used to facilitate the design of guide RNAs (gRNAs) for use with the CRISPR/Cas gene editing system.


CRISPR-Cas
The CRISPR/Cas (clustered regularly interspaced short palindromic repeats/CRISPR associated nucleases) system was originally discovered to be an acquired immune response mechanism used by archaea and bacteria. It has since been adopted for use as a tool in the genetic engineering of higher organisms.

Designing an appropriate gRNA is an important element of genome editing with the CRISPR/Cas system. A gRNA can and at times does have unintended interactions ("off-targets") with other locations of the genome of interest. For a given candidate gRNA, these tools report its list of potential off-targets in the genome thereby allowing the designer to evaluate its suitability prior to embarking on any experiments.

Scientists have also begun exploring the mechanics of the CRISPR/Cas system and what governs how good, or active, a gRNA is at directing the Cas nuclease to a specific location of the genome of interest. As a result of this work, new methods of assessing a gRNA for its 'activity' have been published, and it is now best practice to consider both the unintended interactions of a gRNA as well as the predicted activity of a gRNA at the design stage.

Table

The below table lists available tools and their attributes.

References 

Genetic engineering
Genome editing